Streptophyta, informally the streptophytes (from the Greek strepto 'twisted', for the morphology of the sperm of some members), is a clade of plants. The composition of the clade varies considerably between authors, but the definition employed here includes land plants and all green algae except the Chlorophyta and the more basal Prasinodermophyta.

Classifications
The composition of Streptophyta and similar groups (Streptophytina, Charophyta) varies in each classification. Some authors are more restrictive, including only the Charales and Embryophyta (e.g., Streptophyta Jeffrey 1967; Adl et al. 2012, Streptophytina Lewis & McCourt 2004), others include more groups (e.g., Charophyta Lewis & McCourt 2004; Karol et al. 2009; Adl et al. 2012, Streptophyta Bremer, 1985; de Reviers 2002; Leliaert et al. 2012, Streptobionta Kenrick & Crane 1997; some authors use this broader definition, but exclude the Embryophyta, e.g., Charophyta Cavalier-Smith 1993; Leliaert et al. 2012, Charophyceae Mattox & Stewart, 1984, Streptophycophytes de Reviers, 2002).

The organism, streptophyta, includes both unicellular and multicellular organisms. All living green plants belong to the major phylums including Streptophyta and chlorophyta. The Streptophyta phylum contains the charophyte green algae in freshwater habitat and also all land plants. Another thing about streptophyta is that this organism reproduces sexually by conjugation. There is another organism that is very similar to streptophyta is the Mesostigma viride organism and it is a green flagellate. Streptophyta include the charophycean lineage along with bryophytes and tracheophytes. Bryophytes are land plants that include liverworts, hornworts and mosses, and tracheophytes are vascular plants. The organism, streptophyta, was also found in Bahia, Brazil, and is characterized by having cell walls composed of a single unit, without pores or other ornamentations. The phylum Streptophyta comprises all land plants and six monophyletic groups of charophycean green algae.

These earlier classifications have not taken into account that the Coleochaetophyceae and the Zygnemophyceae appear to have emerged in the Charophyceae + Embryophyta clade, resulting in the synonymy of the Phragmoplastophyta and Streptophytina/Streptophyta sensu stricto (a.k.a. Adl 2012) nomenclature.

Jeffrey, 1967
 Streptophyta
 Charales
 Embryophyta

Lewis & McCourt 2004
 Division Charophyta (charophyte algae and embryophytes)
 Class Mesostigmatophyceae (mesostigmatophytes)
 Class Chlorokybophyceae (chlorokybophytes)
 Class Klebsormidiophyceae (klebsormidiophytes)
 Class Zygnemophyceae (conjugates)
 Order Zygnematales (filamentous conjugates and saccoderm desmids)
 Order Desmidiales (placoderm desmids)
 Class Coleochaetophyceae (coleochaetophytes)
 Order Coleochaetales
 Subdivision Streptophytina
 Class Charophyceae (same as the Smith system, 1938)
 Order Charales (charophytes sensu stricto)
 Class Embryophyceae (embryophytes)

Leliaert et al. 2012 

Streptophyta
charophytes
Mesostigmatophyceae
Chlorokybophyceae
Klebsormidiophyceae
Charophyceae
Zygnematophyceae
Coleochaetophyceae
Embryophyta (land plants)

Adl et al. 2012

 Archaeplastida Adl et al. 2005
Chloroplastida Adl et al. 2005 (Viridiplantae Cavalier-Smith 1981)
 Chlorophyta Pascher 1914, emend. Lewis & McCourt 2004
 Charophyta Migula 1897, emend. Karol et al. 2009 (Charophyceae Smith 1938, Mattox & Stewart 1984)
 Chlorokybus Geitler 1942
 Mesostigma Lauterborn 1894
 Klebsormidiophyceae van den Hoek et al. 1995
 Phragmoplastophyta Lecointre & Guyander 2006
 Zygnematophyceae van den Hoek et al. 1995, emend. Hall et al. 2009
 Coleochaetophyceae Jeffrey 1982
 Streptophyta Jeffrey 1967
 Charophyceae Smith 1938, emend. Karol et al. 2009 (Charales Lindley 1836; Charophytae Engler 1887)
 Embryophyta Engler 1886, emend. Lewis & McCourt 2004 (Cormophyta Endlicher 1836; Plantae Haeckel 1866)

Adl et al. 2019 

 Archaeplastida Adl et al. 2005
Chloroplastida Adl et al. 2005 (Viridiplantae Cavalier-Smith 1981)
 Phylum Streptophyta [Charophyta]
 Chlorokybus atmophyticus
 Mesostigma viridae
Family Klebsomidiophyceae
 Class Phragmoplastophyta
 Family Zygnemataceae
 Order Coleochaetophyceae
 Family Characeae
 Kingdom Embryophyta

Please note the taxonomic name system inconsistency of the Kingdom in Class classification.

Phylogeny
Below is a reconstruction of Streptophyta relationships, based on genomic data.

References 

Bremer, K. (1985) Summary of green plant phylogeny and classification. Cladistics 1:369-385.

External links
The plant tree of life: an overview and some points of view
The closest land plants relatives

Green algae
Infrakingdoms